Frederick March may refer to:

Frederick Hamilton March (1891–1977), Australian soldier
Fredric March (1897–1975), American actor